Oedipina alleni is a species of salamander in the family Plethodontidae. Its common name is Allen's worm salamander. It is found in Costa Rica and Panama.

Habitats
Its natural habitats are subtropical or tropical moist lowland forests, plantations, rural gardens, and heavily degraded former forest. It is threatened by habitat loss.

References

Oedipina
Taxonomy articles created by Polbot
Amphibians described in 1954